Richard Cabut (born 29 March 1960) is a British author, journalist, playwright and musician. Educated Dunstable Grammar School to1978, graduating Polytechnic of North London in 1981. A member of the punk band Brigandage more recently co-editor and author of the anthology Punk is Dead: Modernity Killed Every Night  and author of Looking For A Kiss and Dark Entries.

Journalism 
Between 1982 and 1989 Cabut contributed to the UK music press particularly New Musical Express (as Richard North) and ZigZag (magazine) also Offbeat, Siren, and Punk Lives.
He has  written for the BBC, and contributed to The Guardian, The Daily Telegraph.., Time Out, Big Issue, Artists & Illustrators magazine, The First Post, 3:AM Magazine (also an editor) and the revolutionary art glossy Cold Lips

Kick Fanzine 
Between 1979 and 1982, Cabut published the punk fanzine Kick. 
According to Mathew Worley, 'Kick proved integral to developing a "positive punk" based on a premise of "individuality, creativity, rebellion."'
The fanzine also displayed a mystical approach to political culture. ‘Kick suggested an anarchism that was more of a “mystic affair than a political one”, revolving around an “experiment in life”’

Brigandage 
From 1983 to 1987, Cabut played bass in the punk band Brigandage. 
He played on the cassette album FYM, (FO Records, FO1001, 1984), and on the band’s mini-LP Pretty Funny Thing (Gung Ho, GHLP1, 1986). (12). One track, Angel of Vengeance, featured on the boxset Silhouettes & Statues (A Gothic Revolution 1978 - 1986) (Cherry Red, 2017). Cabut wrote the band’s accompanying sleeve notes. Brigandage is one of the few bands from the 80s positive punk era that, on principle, have refused to reform. He also managed and designed artwork for the band.

Positive Punk 
With the watershed NME article ‘Punk Warriors’ 19 February 1983. Cabut first used the term ‘positive punk’, to describe a cultish following that was soon to influence goth. As described by Mathew Worley, No Future: Punk, Politics and British Youth Culture, 1976–1984. ‘Richard Cabut (Richard North) was the first to outline the basis of what eventually became codified as “goth”.’

The positive punk piece was the basis for an episode of LWT’s Friday night arts and leisure series, South of Watford.

Theatre 
A number of Cabut’s plays have been produced and staged in London and nationwide in the UK, including the Arts Theatre, Covent Garden, London, Breads and Roses Theatre, Clapham, the Tabard Theatre, Chiswick, and the Lost Theatre, Battersea.

Punk is Dead: Modernity Killed Every Night 
Cabut co-edited Punk is Dead: Modernity Killed Every Night.  An anthology with contributions from some of punk’s most important commentators and participants including Jon Savage, Penny Rimbaud, Judy Nylon, Jonh Ingham, Barney Hoskyns, Paul Gorman, Ted Polhemus, Simon Critchley and Simon Reynolds. Cabut provided the introduction and further chapters.

The book was widely reviewed. ‘Punk is Dead shows the transmission of culture as a kind of lucid group dreaming, Kris Kraus, The Times Literary Supplement, 9 January 2018. ‘Richard Cabut… has chosen the theme of punk as a transformative force, a becoming,’ Dickon Edwards, The Wire No. 407, January, 2018. ‘Perhaps the notion to take away is the one of endless possibility’, Kitty Empire, The Observer, 19 November 2017. Author Deborah Levy chose Punk is Dead: Modernity Killed Every Night as one of her books of the year in the New Statesman, 17–23 November 2017.

Short Stories
'Danger Stranger' to the anthology The Edgier Waters: New Writing from Literary Upstarts (ed. Andrew Stevens, Snowbooks, 2006).
'All I Want' to the anthology Affinity (67 Press, 2015). Nominated for a Pushcart Prize in 2016.
Cabut wrote the chapter ‘Positive Punk’,  Ripped, Torn and Cut – Pop, Politics and Punks Fanzines From 1976 Matthew Worley.
'Déjà Vu, Déjà Me, Déjà You' (Between Shadows Press, 2021) was limited to 30 copies.

He contributed to Growing Up With Punk (Nicky Weller, Nice Time, 2018), and 100 Club Stories (Ditto Publishing, 2018).

Novels
Dark Entries (Cold Lips Press, 2019).
Looking for a Kiss (Sweat Drenched Press, 2020).

References 

English music journalists
1960 births
People from Aylesbury
English punk rock bass guitarists
English dramatists and playwrights
Living people